Playing the field can refer to:

 Promiscuity
 Dating multiple partners
 Playing the Field, a British television series
 Playing the Field (album), an album by The Outfield
 Playing the Field (film), an American film starring Gerard Butler